The ELA 09 Junior is a Spanish autogyro designed and produced by ELA Aviación of Córdoba, Andalusia, introduced in the mid-2010s. The aircraft is supplied complete and ready-to-fly.

Design and development
The 09 Junior was designed as an entry-level aircraft for pilots new to gyro flying. Reviewer Werner Pfaendler explains the choice of the aircraft's name and the marketing philosophy: "Junior refers to the target group (newcomer in the gyro aviation) and the price. It does not refer to technical components and instruments that comply with the high standards of the ELA senior gyros. For 35,000 Euros (ready-to-fly, no tax) customers get an excellent, sturdy gyro in plain white. Optional accessories include metallic paint (2,600 Euros), radio ATR 500 (1,500 Euros), or landing lights for 65 Euros and more."

The design features a single main rotor, a two-seats-in tandem open cockpit with a windshield, tricycle landing gear without wheel pants, plus a tail caster and a four-cylinder, liquid and air-cooled, four stroke  Rotax 912 ULS engine in pusher configuration.

Specifications (09 Junior)

See also
List of rotorcraft

References

External links

09
2010s Spanish sport aircraft
Single-engined pusher autogyros